Tsvetelina Marinova Penkova (Bulgarian: Цветелина Маринова Пенкова, born 19 February 1988) is a Bulgarian politician who has been serving as a Member of the European Parliament since the 2019 elections.

In parliament, Penkova has since been serving on the Committee on Budgetary Control, the Committee on Industry, Research and Energy and the Committee on Regional Development. 

In addition to her committee assignments, she is part of the parliament's delegation to the EU-Serbia Stabilisation and Association Parliamentary Committee. She is also a member of the European Internet Forum.

References

MEPs for Bulgaria 2019–2024
Bulgarian Socialist Party MEPs
Women MEPs for Bulgaria
Living people
1988 births